Dicomano is a comune (municipality) in the Metropolitan City of Florence in the Italian region Tuscany, located about  northeast of Florence.

Dicomano borders the following municipalities: Londa, Rufina, San Godenzo, Vicchio.

References

External links

 Official website

Cities and towns in Tuscany